Loss Creek is a stream in the Capital Regional District of British Columbia, Canada. Located on southern Vancouver Island, it flows through a long, steep-sided valley to the Strait of Juan de Fuca on the Pacific Ocean.

Geology
The stream mostly follows an unusually long, straight, narrow, and steep-sided valley, between the Jordan Ridge to the south and the San Juan Ridge to the north. This valley is the surface trace of the Leech River Fault, a major regional fault that marks the contact between the oceanic basalts of the Crescent Terrane (part of Siletzia) to the south, and the metamorphic rocks of the Pacific Rim Terrane to the north.  The Leech River fault is straight because it was originally a strike-slip fault (moving horizontally), but now it is being thrust under Vancouver Island.  As the Pacific Rim rock is uplifted and exposed it rapidly erodes; this releases the occasional gold deposit, which then collects in placer deposits in Loss Creek.

Natural history
The lower reaches of the stream fall within the Juan de Fuca Provincial Park.

Course
The average slope is 3.2% over 16 km (507m/16000m=0.03169). Rapids of 12% slope exist near the mouth of the tributary Gain Creek. The steeper the slope the higher the uplift versus erosion. This indicates an anomaly of uplift compared to the rest of the valley.

Tributaries
All three are right tributaries and are listed in upstream order:
Jack Elliott Creek
Noyse Creek
Gain Creek

References

Rivers of Vancouver Island
Seismic faults of Canada
Juan de Fuca region